The Barnett-class lifeboat consists of three types of non self-righting displacement hull lifeboats operated by the Royal National Lifeboat Institution (RNLI) from its stations around the coasts of the United Kingdom and Ireland between 1923 and 1987.

60 ft Barnett

History
The  Barnett was the first twin-engined, twin-screw RNLI lifeboat, and when introduced in 1923, the largest. Designed by RNLI naval architect James Rennie Barnett, the boats pioneered many features which were to become standard on future lifeboats. They were, however too large to be slipway launched and had to be moored afloat at a time when the RNLI preferred to keep lifeboats in boathouses and consequently, only four were built.

Description
The boats had an open aft cockpit with a shelter ahead of it. The engines were in separate watertight engines rooms with exhaust taken up two side by side  funnels amidships. There were fore and aft survivor cabins below deck. The boats were powered by two RNLI designed 80 bhp DE6 6-cylinder petrol engines, three built by Weyburn Engineering and the other by J. Samuel White. The boats served their stations well until the early fifties when they were replaced by 52 ft Barnetts.

Fleet

51 ft Barnett

History
The 60 ft Barnett was too large and heavy to be slipway launched and so the  type was designed as a scaled down version which would be able to be stationed at a greater number of locations. The class is sometimes referred to as the "Stromness" after the first station to receive one.

Description
The 51 ft Barnett had an open aft cockpit with a shelter ahead of it giving access to the engine room. Ahead of the engine room was a survivor cabin and there was a forward shelter ahead of the mast. The class was powered by two 60 bhp Weyburn CE6 6-cylinder petrol engines with a single exhaust funnel ahead of the aft shelter.

The final boat of the class, was built in 1949;, fourteen years after the end of regular production, and was more akin in deck layout to the first five  boats built around the same time. This boat was powered by two 60 bhp Ferry VE6 6-cylinder diesels and was in effect a prototype for a post war production run of diesel powered boats. However, it was overtaken by events as James Barnett turned to midships cockpits and the new boats emerged as the  class the following year. The only other 51 ft Watson to receive diesel engines was ON 755 which was re-engined with twin Ford based 65 bhp Parsons Barracuda diesels in 1965. In 1976, ON 860 also received Barracudas while serving in the relief fleet and this boat was the final member of the class in service when retired in 1981.

Fleet

52 ft Barnett (Mk. I)
All built by J. Samuel White, Cowes

52 ft Barnett (Mk. II)

References

External links

RNLI
ON943 RNLB Claude Cecil Staniforth